Gali District may refer to:
 Gali District, Abkhazia (Republic of Abkhazia, independence dispute)
 Gali Municipality (Autonomous Republic of Abkhazia within Georgia)